HAES may refer to:

 Hellenic Aeronautical Engineers Society
 Health at Every Size
 Hydroxyethyl starch (HES/HAES)